Great River is a railroad station on the Montauk Branch of the Long Island Rail Road, at Connetquot Avenue and Hawthorne Avenue in Great River, New York. The station opened in 1897.

History

Prior to the establishment of passenger service, the site of Great River station was occupied by a freight-only station built by the South Side Railroad of Long Island (SSRRLI) known as Youngsport station. The station opened in 1897, and the original station building burned down in 1943. Between that time, a sheltered-platform was added to the other side of the tracks. In 1945, a modernist station designed by architect Antonin Raymond replaced it, but it was burned down in 2000. The third station with high-level platforms was built in the late 1990s. The original shelter, however was restored by the East Islip Historical Society, and remains within one of the parking lots along the eastbound platform.

Club House station
East of Great River Station, the South Side Railroad built a private station called Club House station in 1869 to serve the South Side Sportsmen's Club. This station was located between Mileposts 45 and 46 inside today's Bayard Cutting Arboretum, and was among a number of privately-owned stations along the SSRRLI, which were not so uncommon during the 19th Century. It was closed in 1897.

Station layout
The station has two tracks and two four-car long high-level side platforms.

Notable places nearby
Connetquot River State Park
Bayard Cutting Arboretum
Heckscher State Park

References

External links 

Great River Station (East Islip Historic Society)
Great River Station History (TrainsAreFun.com)
Westbound train approaching Great River Station (YouTube)
 Great River Station
 Station from Connetquot Avenue from Google Maps Street View

Long Island Rail Road stations in Suffolk County, New York
Islip (town), New York
Railway stations in the United States opened in 1897